Spinach cake is cake that contains spinach mixed into the batter.

Ispanaklı kek

In Turkish cuisine,  (spinach cake) is a cake prepared with spinach as a primary ingredient.

See also 
 Köylü pastası

References

Cakes
Turkish cakes
Lebanese cuisine
Turkish cuisine
Spinach dishes